The intuitive criterion is a technique for equilibrium refinement in signaling games. It aims to reduce possible outcome scenarios by restricting the possible sender types to types who could obtain higher utility levels by deviating to off-the-equilibrium messages, and to types for which the off-the-equilibrium message is not equilibrium dominated.

Background 
A signaling game is a game in which one player ("sender") has private information regarding his type. He sends a signal ("message") to the other player ("receiver") to indicate his type. The receiver then takes an action. Both the signal and the receiver action can affect both players' utilities. A Perfect Bayesian equilibrium (PBE) in such a game consists of three elements.

 A sender strategy - a function from the sender type to a signal that maximizes this type's utility given the receiver strategy. 
 A receiver belief - a function from the signal to a probability distribution over sender types; the belief must be consistent with the sender strategy in the sense of Bayes' rule.
 A receiver strategy - a function from the signal to an action which maximizes the receiver's utility given his belief.

The definition of PBE does, however, not require anything about signals that the sender never sends, since Bayes' rule is not applicable for events that occur with probability zero. Therefore, it is possible to have a PBE with the following properties.

 The sender only sends one signal. 
 The receiver believes that, if the sender did send a different signal, then the receiver would take an action that effectively "punishes" the sender by giving low utility to all types.
 There exists a belief such that the punishing action is optimal for the receiver.

While this satisfies the definition of PBE, the receiver belief might be "unreasonable". The intuitive criterion, like most  refinement techniques, is based on restricting the beliefs off the equilibrium path. The intuitive criterion was presented by In-Koo Cho and David M. Kreps in a 1987 article. Their idea was to try to reduce the set of equilibria by requiring off-equilibrium receiver beliefs to be reasonable in some sense.

Intuitively, we can eliminate a PBE if there is exists a sender type who wants to deviate, assuming that the receiver has a reasonable belief. It is reasonable to believe that the deviating sender is of a type who would benefit from the deviation in at least the best-case scenario. If a type of sender could not benefit from the deviation even if the receiver changed his belief in the best possible way for the sender, then the receiver should reasonably put zero probability on the sender being of that type. 
The deviating sender type  could persuasively tell the receiver to interpret his deviating signal  favorably: 

I am sending the message . Please re-think your belief. If you switch to a reasonable belief, then you will have to re-think what your optimal response action is. If sending this message so convinces you to change your response action, then, as you can see, it is in my interest to deviate to the signal .

Let  denote the sender utility as a function of her type , her signal , and the receiver action . Given any PBE with sender strategy  and receiver strategy , the equilibrium payoff of any type  is denoted . The set of types such that deviating to signal  can, in the best case, yield a weakly higher payoff than the equilibrium payoff is

For types outside of this set, the signal  is called equilibrium dominated.

A particular PBE is eliminated by the intuitive criterion if there exists a sender type  and a deviating signal  that guarantees for this type a payoff above their equilibrium payoff as long as the receiver has a reasonable belief, that is, assigns zero probability to the deviation having been made by a type for whom  is equilibrium dominated. Formally,

Criticisms
Other game theorists have criticized the intuitive criterion and suggested alternative refinements such as Universal Divinity.

Example
In the standard Spence signaling game, with two types of senders, a continuum of pooling equilibrium persist under solution concepts such as sequential equilibrium and perfect bayesian equilibrium. But the Cho-Kreps intuitive criterion eliminates all pooling equilibria. In the same game, there is also a continuum of separating equilibria, but the intuitive criterion eliminates all the separating equilibria except for the most efficient one -- the one where low-ability types are exactly indifferent between acquiring the amount of education that high-ability types do and not acquiring any education at all.

A sketch of a typical model shows why (this model is worked out more fully in signalling games).

The intuitive criterion also rules out all pooling equilibria. Consider the equilibrium in which both types choose  and receive the expected ability of 5 as their wage. That is because if they do believe, and he really is the high type, his payoff will rise from 5 - 0 = 5 to 10 - 4 = 6, but if he were the low type, his payoff would fall from 5 - 0 = 5 to 10 - 2*4 = 2. This argument can be applied to any of the pooling equilibria.

Notes

References
Mas-Colell, Whinston, Green (1995) Microeconomic Theory.

Game theory equilibrium concepts